The Coalition of Iran's Independent Volunteers is a principlist political group in Iran. Emad Afroogh is Spokesperson of the group. The group was established before 2004 Iranian legislative election.

References

Principlist political groups in Iran
Electoral lists for Iranian legislative election, 2004